"Buddy" is the third single released by De La Soul from their album 3 Feet High and Rising.

The song is often cited as an example of an effective remix; one that includes a change of song lyrics or beat.  In this case, both the original song's lyrics and the musical bed received a makeover.  With its sample of the bassline from Taana Gardner's 1981 song "Heartbeat", the 7 minute 12" version was clearly tailor-made for dancefloor and provided a striking contrast to the laid back album version.

The song was also famous for featuring the major members of the Native Tongues posse, including Q-Tip of A Tribe Called Quest, Jungle Brothers, Queen Latifah and Monie Love. While Phife Dawg appears in the video itself and is heard in the extended mix, the mix in the video eliminates his entire verse.

Music video
The music video for "Buddy" is introduced by Prince Paul who explains, "'Buddy' doesn't mean 'girl' or 'sex' for that matter, 'buddy' simply means 'body', bodies of all kind." While the majority of the video consists of the members of the Native Tongues posse performing straight to camera, this is interspersed with brief segments of black-and-white footage, one of which featuring a speech balloon that remarks "this video makes no sense!"

Along with those who appeared in the song, the video also featured a cameo from rapper Chi-Ali.

Track listing
 "Buddy (Native Tongue Decision)" - 7:17
Guest Appearances: Q-Tip, Phife Dawg, Jungle Brothers, Queen Latifah, Monie Love
 "Buddy (Native Tongue Decision Instrumental)" - 5:50
 "Ghetto Thang (Vocal)" - 3:45
 "Ghetto Thang (Ghetto Ximer)" - 3:55
 "Buddy (Vocal)" - 4:58
Guest Appearances: Q-Tip, Jungle Brothers
 "Ghetto Thang (Ghetto Ximer Instrumental)" - 3:47

Charts

1989 singles
De La Soul songs
Songs written by Vincent Mason
Songs written by Kelvin Mercer
Songs written by David Jude Jolicoeur
Songs written by Prince Paul (producer)
Song recordings produced by Prince Paul (producer)
Tommy Boy Records singles
1988 songs
Posse cuts